Aslan Kayratuly Darabayev  (Aslan Qairatūly Darabaev; born 21 January 1989) is a Kazakh footballer who plays as a winger for Caspiy in the Kazakhstan Premier League.

Career

Club
On 28 December 2018, Darabayev signed for FC Irtysh Pavlodar, leaving by mutual consent on 3 May 2019.

On 26 June 2019, Darabayev signed for Zhetysu.

Career statistics

Club

International

Statistics accurate as of match played 16 November 2021

International goals
Scores and results list Kazakhstan's goal tally first.

References 

Living people
1986 births
FC Shakhter Karagandy players
FC Aktobe players
FC Atyrau players
FC Kairat players
FC Irtysh Pavlodar players
FC Tobol players
FC Zhetysu players
FC Caspiy players
Kazakhstani footballers
Kazakhstan international footballers
Kazakhstan Premier League players
Sportspeople from Karaganda
Association football midfielders